Bernard Hazen McAndrew (August 7, 1917 — August 27, 1993) was a Canadian ice hockey player who played seven games in the National Hockey League for the Brooklyn Americans during the 1941–42 season. The rest of his career, which lasted from 1939 to 1950, was spent in different minor leagues.

Career statistics

Regular season and playoffs

External links
 

1917 births
1993 deaths
Anglophone Quebec people
Brooklyn Americans players
Canadian ice hockey defencemen
Hershey Bears players
Ice hockey people from Quebec
Ontario Hockey Association Senior A League (1890–1979) players
People from Outaouais
Philadelphia Ramblers players
Springfield Indians players
Vancouver Canucks (WHL) players